The men's individual recurve archery competition at the 2019 Summer Universiade was held in the Partenio Stadium, Avellino, Italy and the Royal Palace in Caserta, Italy between July 8 and 13.

Records 
Prior to the competition, the world and Universiade records were as follows.

72 arrows ranking round

Ranking round 

The ranking round took place on 9 July 2019 to determine the seeding for the elimination rounds. It consisted of two rounds of 36 arrows, with a maximum score of 720.

Elimination round

Section 1

Section 2

Section 3

Section 4

Section 5

Section 6

Section 5

Section 8

Final Rounds

References

Men's individual recurve